Freak Show is a 2017 American comedy-drama film directed by Trudie Styler and written by Patrick J. Clifton and Beth Rigazio, based on the novel of the same name by James St. James. The film stars Alex Lawther, Abigail Breslin, AnnaSophia Robb, Ian Nelson, Celia Weston, Laverne Cox, and Bette Midler.

The film had its world premiere at the Berlin International Film Festival on February 13, 2017. It was released on January 12, 2018, by IFC Films.

Plot 
We meet Billy Bloom gazing into the mirror, planning his make-up, and know he is no ordinary teen. Flashing back to his younger years, his indulgent, flambouyant, alcoholic mother ‘muv’ (Bette Midler) worships him, actively encouraging him to dress up. It causes much arguing between his mother and conservative father Bill who separate. He lives with her for seven years in Connecticut before being transported to live in his wealthy father’s mansion in the deep south after her sudden disappearance (later revealed to be rehab).

Billy retreats more into his world of fantasy dress up, ignoring housekeeper Florence’s advice to dress conservatively, like in jeans, for his first day at the local high school. However his idea of conservative is quite flambouyant, with eyeliner and lipstick, a ruffled pirate top, little black jacket and hat. He is ostentatiously overfamiliar, leading to him being quickly ostracised.

Noone speaks to him positively on the first day, but on the second, not only does Mary Jane befriend him, giving the lowdown on the most prominent students, but ‘Flip’ (Mark) Kelly introduces himself. He is the school hero, and also shows Billy his support. When the three girl clique of bullies ask Billie for fashion tips, he brilliantly tears them apart, then there’s the homophobic jocks, and the loner Bernie with a deep seated resentment towards him, a mask for something deeper. (Later on, he tries it on with him in the boys toilet, but wants to stay in the closet.)

Billy’s biology teacher allows students to constantly bully him, treating him stereotypically as someone assumed to be gay. To retaliate, he wears outrageous outfits for weeks to combat the onslaught of spitballs launched at him. It culminates to the day he dons a completely outlandish, mini-length wedding gown with a veil and garish red makeup. Billy’s detoured to the lecture hall, where five or six jocks beat him to within an inch of his life. Flip and another stop them, but he is in a coma for five days.

Flip visits Billy regularly during the coma, and he convinces him to help him home. After seeing Larry’s Jackson Pollock, Flip opens up about his preference of art over football. Mary Jane keeps him up-to-date on developments at school, applauding his martyrdom which has paved everyone’s way. The administration expelled those who attacked him and has assemblies about hate crimes to aid tolerance.

As high school is typically about conforming, fitting in and not drawing attention to yourself, Flip tries to get Billy to tone himself down during school hours. The next day, Billy does a theatrical presentation for his Great Gatsby book report dressed and acting as Zelda Fitzgerald. Later that day, an incident in gym at the rope climb, triggers a homophobic reaction towards him.

Billy comes home to find Muv. Initially believing she has come to get him, his dad lets him be present so he can see she is only there for money, as she had him to produce Bill an heir. Stunned, Billy wanders off to the kitchen and Florence is kind to him. Flip comes to see Billy, and drunken Muv falls over him.

Wandering to the school grounds, Billy announces his candidacy for homecoming queen against the other contender Lynette, queen of the school. They drum up support before they have to give campaign speeches to the school to gain their vote. Both come out on floats of their choosing, hers an unimaginative float of her with her friends in red, his a glittery, purple heel, he in a slinky silver sheath.

The team narrowly wins the homecoming game, the last play also severely injuring Flip/Mark’s shoulder (so he can pursue art). In the auditorium, Lynette’s speech is openly hateful towards anyone who’s not straight whereas Billy’s is a plea for understanding. He gets a standing ovation, yet still loses.

Billy’s dad congratulates him on his victory, of facing the challenge unafraid, and speaking his truth. On the school campus, his real triumph can be seen. People are less afraid to show themselves and there is greater tolerance, a joyful embrace of diversity.

Cast 
 Alex Lawther as Billy Bloom, a funny, good-hearted teenager and the new student at an ultra-conservative high school
 Eddie Schweighardt as young Billy Bloom
 Abigail Breslin as Lynette, the head cheerleader and high school queen bee, and Billy's rival
 Mickey Sumner as Dr. Veronica Vickers
 Bette Midler as Muv, Billy's mother
 Larry Pine as Billy's father
 AnnaSophia Robb as Blah Blah Blah / Mary Jane
 Ian Nelson as Mark "Flip" Kelly, Billy's friend
 Lorraine Toussaint as Flossie, Billy's nanny
 Laverne Cox as Felicia, a reporter
 Willa Fitzgerald as Tiffany
 Celia Weston as Florence
 Walden Hudson as Bib Oberman

Production 
On October 2, 2015, it was announced that Trudie Styler would make her directorial debut with the young adult LGBT film Freak Show, based on the novel of same name by James St. James. Patrick J. Clifton and Beth Rigazio adapted the novel, while producers on the film would be Celine Rattray, Charlotte Ubben, and Styler through Maven Pictures along with Drew Barrymore and Nancy Juvonen's Flower Films, and Jeffrey Coulter and Bryan Rabin.

Principal photography on the film began on October 27, 2015, in New York City. Dan Romer composed the film's score.

Release
The film had its world premiere at the Berlin International Film Festival on February 13, 2017. Shortly after, IFC Films acquired U.S. distribution rights to the film. It was released on January 12, 2018.

Reception
 the film holds a 53% approval rating on review aggregator website Rotten Tomatoes, based on 43 reviews with an average rating of 5.62/10. The website's critical consensus reads, "Freak Show relies on engaging performances and obviously good intentions to cover for its clichéd story and uneven direction – and for some viewers, it may well be enough." On Metacritic, the film has a weighted average score of 54 out of 100, based on 8 critics, indicating "mixed or average reviews".

The Variety review stated, "Trudie Styler's sparkly but superficial directorial debut is a gay coming-of-age tale that presumes more love for its fabulous hero than it earns."

References

External links 
 
 
 
 

2017 films
2017 comedy-drama films
2017 directorial debut films
2017 LGBT-related films
2010s coming-of-age comedy-drama films
2010s high school films
2010s teen comedy-drama films
American coming-of-age comedy-drama films
American high school films
American teen comedy-drama films
American teen LGBT-related films
Cross-dressing in American films
Films based on American novels
Films based on young adult literature
Films directed by Trudie Styler
Films produced by Trudie Styler
Films scored by Dan Romer
Films set in New York City
Films shot in New York City
Flower Films films
Gay-related films
LGBT-related comedy-drama films
LGBT-related coming-of-age films
2010s English-language films
2010s American films